Glenstal Abbey School is an all boys independent day and boarding Roman Catholic secondary school, located on the grounds of Glenstal Abbey in Murroe, County Limerick. It is run by monks of the Benedictine order. The school offers seven-day full boarding, as well as day boarding (Mon-Sat). The school is regularly ranked among the top schools in Ireland.

History

Glenstal is a Norman Revivalist Castle, designed by William Bardwell, an English architect and built by Sir Matthew Barrington in 1839. Sir Charles and Lady Barrington left Ireland permanently in 1925.

The castle and estate were purchased shortly after by Monsignor James J. Ryan, retired president of St Patrick’s College, Thurles, for the nominal sum of £2,000. Some months after the purchase, Msgr Ryan wrote to Celestine Golenvaux, the Abbot of the Benedictine monastery at Maredsous, and invited him to come to Ireland and set up a daughter house in Glenstal and by March 1927, the first two Belgian monks had arrived at Glenstal to establish the new house. In September 1932, the monks opened a Secondary School with Fr Columba Skerret as Headmaster, and with an intake of just seven pupils. The first lay teacher of the school was Mr Vincent Quirke.

Like many other religious organisations, Glenstal Abbey was faced with allegations of child abuse. Records indicate four historic allegations against two members of the monastic community relating to abuse at Glenstal Abbey School.They were reported and investigated; in no case were there criminal or civil proceedings. In a 2014 report The National Board for Safeguarding Children (NBSC) stated that the Benedictine community handled these accusations well with proper action, including removal from monastic life and treatment.

Surroundings

Glenstal is south facing and has views of the Galtee Mountains.

School life

The school is divided into three houses, Junior House, Inter House and Senior House. Each house has its own Housemaster. Each house has dormitories for the boys to sleep in, a common room with a television, the housemaster's office and pantry.

Junior House holds the first and second years, Inter House the third and fourth years and Senior House the fifth and sixth years. The dormitories range in size from one bed to about sixteen.

Notable former pupils. 
Notable former pupils
John Blayney, Judge of the Supreme Court
Kim Carroll, composer and musician.
Jack Stafford, rugby player.
John Magnier, businessman and former senator Seanad Éireann.
Richard Tierney, Chief Executive Officer of St Patrick's festival.
Eamonn Quigley, researcher in medecine.
Tony O'Connor, Judge of the High Court.
Patrick Martyn-Hemphill, 5th Baron Hemphill, former member of the House of Lords, Senior stewart of the Irish National Hunt Society, former chairman of the Galway Race Committee.
Ian Nagle, ruby player
John M. Kelly, former Minister for Trade, Commerce and Tourism, acting Minister for Foreign Affairs, Attorney General and Government Chief Whip.
Francis French, 7th Baron de Freyne, aristocrat and former member of the House of Lords.
Peter Cunningham, writer.
Duncan Casey, rugby player.
Paddy Cosgrave
Ben Healy, rugby player
Sean Lucy, Poet and Professor at University College Cork
Abbot Mark Patrick Hederman

Sports

The main sport in Glenstal is and has always been rugby union. For all students in first and second year it is mandatory that they play rugby union. Teams are fielded at all ages from U-14 to U-19 and are involved in both friendly and competitive fixtures from late-September until March.

Over the years Glenstal has produced a number of rugby players, athletes, jockeys and tennis players. In recent years the school has enjoyed some success off the rugby pitch in local and regional track and field, tennis, equestrian and soccer competitions.

The school won the Munster Schools Senior Cup, for their first time on 18 March 2018 beating Christian Brothers College, Cork, on a scoreline of 18-17.

Sports facilities

Glenstal's sporting facilities include a sports hall, four rugby pitches, a soccer pitch, six tennis courts and a gym (for seniors only). Glenstal does not have a swimming pool, but there is a large lake beside the main rugby pitches where students are allowed to swim (with staff supervision) during the summer term.

During the summer term, the main rugby pitches are turned into a 400 m grass running track and there is an area for shot put, javelin and discus throwing. There are also soccer pitches marked out.

Music

Glenstal's music department offers lessons in many instruments, for example drums, guitar, violin, clarinet, piano. Most of these instruments are taught to the students by people from outside of the school who come in during the day or evening to give half-hour lessons.

Theatre

Glenstal Abbey School puts on a musical or straight drama every year around March. Usually an outside director is engaged, who works closely with the musical director to put the show together. The roles are almost always played by students of the school, the only exception being some male parts played by boys from nearby boy schools. Previous shows have been Joseph and the Amazing Technicolor Dreamcoat, Dr. Jeckyll and Mr. Hyde, Oliver!, We Will Rock You, Buddy – The Buddy Holly Story and Grease (musical).

References

External links
Glenstal Abbey School website
Monastery website
The Glenstal Old Boys Society

Secondary schools in County Limerick
Private schools in the Republic of Ireland
Catholic boarding schools in Ireland
Catholic secondary schools in the Republic of Ireland
Benedictine secondary schools
1932 establishments in Ireland
Educational institutions established in 1932